Patrick Puchegger (born 4 May 1995) is an Austrian professional footballer who plays as a centre-back for 2. Liga club Admira Wacker.

Club career
He made his Austrian Football Bundesliga debut for SK Sturm Graz on 30 July 2017 in a game against FK Austria Wien.

Puchegger joined recently relegated 2. Liga club Admira Wacker on 10 June 2022, signing a two-year contract.

References

External links
 

1995 births
People from Scheibbs District
Living people
Austrian footballers
Austria youth international footballers
Austrian expatriate footballers
Expatriate footballers in Germany
FC Bayern Munich II players
SK Sturm Graz players
SKN St. Pölten players
SKU Amstetten players
Floridsdorfer AC players
FC Admira Wacker Mödling players
Austrian Football Bundesliga players
2. Liga (Austria) players
Austrian expatriate sportspeople in Germany
Association football defenders
Footballers from Lower Austria